The 2017–18 season was Everton's 64th consecutive season in the top flight of English football and their 140th year in existence. They participated in the Premier League, FA Cup, EFL Cup, and UEFA Europa League. Everton had a disappointing start to the campaign, leading to the dismissal of manager Ronald Koeman in October after a 5-2 home loss to Arsenal, Koeman sacked just 2 months into his second campaign in charge after guiding Everton into the UEFA Europa League in an impressive first season at the club. It was over a month after his departure that Sam Allardyce took over from interim manager David Unsworth, as prime target, Watford manager Marco Silva, was unable to be released from a contract with The Hornets to take over at Goodison Park. The fiasco led to a legal suit after Silva was controversially sacked by Watford after a downturn in results following his failure to secure the Everton job, and when Silva took over at Everton 2018-19, Everton were forced to pay £4 million in compensation to Watford for what was described as "an unwarranted approach" whilst Silva was still at Watford. Allardyce guided the club to 8th in the league, but could not prevent exits in the Europa League group stage and the FA Cup third round. Allardyce was dismissed at the conclusion of the season, with Everton's fans criticising Allardyce's style of play on a number of occasions; the club stated "The decision is part of a long-term plan".

The season covered the period from 1 July 2017 to 30 June 2018.

Transfers

Transfers in

Transfers out

Loans in

Loans out

Overall transfer activity

Spending
Summer:  £133,100,000

Winter:  £27,000,000

Total:  £160,100,000

Income
Summer: £95,100,000

Winter:  £15,000,000

Total:  £110,100,000

Expenditure
Summer:  £38,000,000

Winter:  £12,000,000

Total:  £50,000,000

Pre-season

Friendlies
On 22 June 2017, Everton announced four pre-season friendlies against Sevilla, Gor Mahia, FC Twente and Genk.

Competitions

Premier League

League table

Result summary

Results by matchday

Matches
On 14 June 2017, Everton's Premier League fixtures were announced.

FA Cup
In the FA Cup, Everton entered the competition in the third round and were drawn away to Liverpool.

EFL Cup
Everton joined the competition in third round and were drawn at home to Sunderland. An away trip to Chelsea was announced for the fourth round.

UEFA Europa League

Qualifying
Everton entered the competition in the third qualifying round, where they faced Slovakian side Ružomberok. After winning the tie 2–0 on aggregate they were drawn against Croatian team Hajduk Split in the play-off round.

Group stage
On 25 August 2017, Everton were drawn into Group E alongside Lyon, Atalanta and Apollon Limassol.

Players

First team squad

(captain)

Out on loan

Squad statistics

Appearances

|-
!colspan="14"|Players loaned out during season

|-
!colspan="14"|Players who left during the season
|-

|}

Goalscorers
{| class="wikitable" style="text-align:center;"
|-
!"width:35px;"|
!"width:35px;"|
!"width:35px;"|
!"width:200px;"|Player
!"width:75px;"|Premier League
!"width:75px;"|Europa League
!"width:75px;"|FA Cup
!"width:75px;"|League Cup
!"width:75px;"|Total
|-
|-
| 1 || FW || 10 || align=left|  || 10 || 1 || 0 || 0 || 11
|-
| 2 || FW || 19 || align=left|  || 8 || 0 || 0 || 1 || 9
|-
| 3 || FW || 29 || align=left|  || 4 || 1 || 0 || 3 || 8
|-
| 4 || MF || 18 || align=left|  || 4 || 1 || 1 || 0 || 6
|-
| 5 || FW || 14 || align=left|  || 5 || 0 || 0 || 0 || 5
|-
|rowspan=3| 6 || DF || 3 || align=left|  || 2 || 1 || 0 || 0 || 3
|-
| FW || 11 || align=left|  || 3 || 0 || 0 || 0 || 3
|-
| MF || 17 || align=left|  || 2 || 1 || 0 || 0 || 3
|-
| rowspan=4|9 || DF || 5 || align=left|  || 1 || 1 || 0 || 0 || 2
|-
| MF || 26 || align=left|  || 2 || 0 || 0 || 0 || 2
|-
| MF || 27 || align=left|  || 0 || 2 || 0 || 0 || 2
|-
| FW || 31 || align=left|  || 0 || 2 || 0 || 0 || 2
|-
| rowspan=3|13 || DF || 4 || align=left|  || 0 || 1 || 0 || 0 || 1
|-
| MF || 7 || align=left|  || 1 || 0 || 0 || 0 || 1
|-
| FW || 9 || align=left|  || 0 || 1 || 0 || 0 || 1
|-
| colspan="4" align=center| Own goals || 2 || 0 || 0 || 0 || 2
|-
!colspan="4"|Total || 44 || 12 || 1 || 4 || 61
|-

Disciplinary record

{|class="wikitable" style="text-align: center;"
|-
!rowspan="2" style="width:50px;"|Rank
!rowspan="2" style="width:50px;"|Position
!rowspan="2" style="width:180px;"|Name
!colspan="2"|Premier League
!colspan="2"|FA Cup
!colspan="2"|EFL Cup
!colspan="2"|Europa League
!colspan="2"|Total
|-
!style="width:30px;"|
!style="width:30px;"|
!style="width:30px;"|
!style="width:30px;"|
!style="width:30px;"|
!style="width:30px;"|
!style="width:30px;"|
!style="width:30px;"|
!style="width:30px;"|
!style="width:30px;"|
|-
| rowspan=2|1
|MF
|align=left| Tom Davies

|6
|0

|0
|0

|1
|0

|1
|0

!8
!0
|-
|MF
|align=left| Morgan Schneiderlin

|4
|1

|0
|0

|0
|0

|2
|1

!6
!2
|-
|rowspan=2|3
|DF
|align=left| Ashley Williams

|3
|0

|0
|0

|1
|0

|2
|0

!6
!0
|-
|MF
|align=left| Wayne Rooney

|5
|0

|1
|0

|0
|0

|0
|0

!6
!0
|-
|5
|MF
|align=left| Idrissa Gueye

|4
|1

|0
|0

|0
|0

|0
|0

!4
!1
|-
|6
|FW
|align=left| Dominic Calvert-Lewin

|3
|0

|0
|0

|0
|0

|1
|0

!4
!0
|-
|rowspan=3|7
|MF
|align=left| Gylfi Sigurðsson

|2
|0

|0
|0

|0
|0

|1
|0

!3
!0
|-
|DF
|align=left| Mason Holgate

|3
|0

|0
|0

|0
|0

|0
|0

!3
!0
|-
|DF
|align=left| Cuco Martina

|1
|0

|0
|0

|0
|0

|2
|0

!3
!0
|-
|rowspan=7|10
|FW
|align=left| Oumar Niasse

|2
|0

|0
|0

|0
|0

|0
|0

!2
!0
|-
|DF
|align=left| Phil Jagielka

|1
|0

|0
|0

|1
|0

|0
|0

!2
!0
|-
|MF
|align=left| Muhamed Bešić

|0
|0

|0
|0

|0
|0

|2
|0

!2
!0
|-
|MF
|align=left| Theo Walcott

|2
|0

|0
|0

|0
|0

|0
|0

!2
!0
|-
|DF
|align=left| Jonjoe Kenny

|2
|0

|0
|0

|0
|0

|0
|0

!2
!0
|-
|DF
|align=left| Michael Keane

|2
|0

|0
|0

|0
|0

|0
|0

!2
!0
|-
|MF
|align=left| James McCarthy

|0
|0

|1
|0

|1
|0

|0
|0

!2
!0
|-
|rowspan=5|17
|DF
|align=left| Leighton Baines

|1
|0

|0
|0

|0
|0

|0
|0

!1
!0
|-
|MF
|align=left| Kevin Mirallas

|1
|0

|0
|0

|0
|0

|0
|0

!1
!0
|-
|FW
|align=left| Ademola Lookman

|0
|0

|0
|0

|0
|0

|1
|0

!1
!0
|-
|MF
|align=left| Nikola Vlašić

|0
|0

|0
|0

|0
|0

|1
|0

!1
!0
|-
|MF
|align=left| Beni Baningime

|0
|0

|0
|0

|0
|0

|1
|0

!1
!0
|-
!colspan=3|Total!!42!!2!!2!!0!!4!!0!!14!!1!!62!!3

References

Everton
Everton F.C. seasons